Gene Mitz is a former American football coach.  He served as the head football coach at North Park College—now known as North Park University—in Chicago for three seasons, from 1975 to 1977, compiling a record of 2–25.

Head coaching record

References

Year of birth missing
Possibly living people
North Park Vikings football coaches